Derren is a masculine given name. It is a variant of Darren. It may refer to:

 Derren Brown, English psychological illusionist
 Derren Litten, British comedy writer and actor
 Derren Nesbitt, English actor popular in the 1950s
 Derren Witcombe, New Zealand Rugby Union footballer

References

See also 
 Darron
 Darren